The South African Railways Class 10E of 1985 is an electric locomotive.

In 1985 and 1986, the South African Railways placed fifty Class 10E electric locomotives with a Co-Co wheel arrangement in mainline service.

Manufacturers

The 3 kV DC Class 10E electric locomotive was designed for the South African Railways (SAR) by Toshiba of Japan and was built by Union Carriage and Wagon (UCW) in Nigel, Transvaal. Toshiba supplied the electrical equipment while UCW was responsible for the mechanical components and assembly. 

Fifty locomotives were delivered by UCW in 1985 and 1986, numbered in the range from 10-001 to 10-050. UCW did not allocate builder’s numbers to the locomotives it built for the SAR, but used the SAR unit numbers for their record keeping.

Characteristics
The Class 10E was introduced as a new standard 3 kV DC heavy goods locomotive.

The entire fleet of the Class 10E family of electric locomotives use electronic chopper control which is smoother in comparison to the rheostatic resistance control which was used in the Classes 1E to 6E1 electric locomotives.

Brakes
The locomotive makes use of either regenerative or rheostatic braking, as the situation demands. Both traction and electric braking power are continuously variable, with the electric braking optimised to such an extent that maximum use will be made of the regenerative braking capacity of the 3 kV DC network, with the ability to automatically change over to rheostatic braking whenever the overhead supply system becomes non-receptive.

Bogies
The Class 10E was built with sophisticated traction linkages on the bogies, similar to the bogie design which was introduced on the Class 6E1 in 1969. Together with the locomotive's electronic wheel-slip detection system, these traction struts, mounted between the linkages on the bogies and the locomotive body and colloquially referred to as grasshopper legs, ensure the maximum transfer of power to the rails without causing wheel-slip by reducing the adhesion of the leading bogie and increasing that of the trailing bogie by as much as 15% upon starting off.

Orientation
These dual cab locomotives have a roof access ladder on one side only, just to the right of the cab access door. The roof access ladder end is marked as the no. 2 end.

Identifying Features
In visual appearance the Class 10E can be distinguished from the later model Class 10E2 by the roof ends and the sills. The Class 10E has riffled roof ends and parts of the sill protrude slightly past the bottom edge of the body sides. The Class 10E2 has smooth unriffled roof ends and no part of the sill protrudes past the bottom edge of the body sides.

Service
The Class 10E is employed mainly to haul ore trains on the line between Kimberley and Hotazel in the Northern Cape and it also works between Kimberley and the Witwatersrand. Most are shedded at Beaconsfield near Kimberley, with several also at Welgedacht near Springs.

Liveries
All the Class 10E locomotives were delivered in the SAR red oxide livery with signal red buffer beams and cowcatchers and a yellow V stripe on the ends, folded over to a horizontal stripe below the side windows. The number plates on the sides were mounted without the traditional three-stripe yellow wings. In the 1990s some of them were repainted in the Spoornet orange livery with a yellow and blue chevron pattern on the buffer beams and cowcatchers. Several later received the Spoornet maroon livery. In the late 1990s many were repainted in the Spoornet blue livery with outline numbers on the long hood sides.

Illustration

References

3080
Co-Co locomotives
Union Carriage & Wagon locomotives
Toshiba locomotives
Cape gauge railway locomotives
Railway locomotives introduced in 1985
1985 in South Africa